Nenad Bjeković (born 5 November 1947) is a Serbian football administrator and former player and manager.

Club career
Born in Lazarevo, a village near Zrenjanin, Bjeković started out at his local club Zadrugar Lazarevo, before switching to Proleter Zrenjanin. He stayed there for four years, making his Yugoslav First League debut in the 1967–68 season.

In 1969, Bjeković was transferred to Partizan. He spent seven seasons with the Crno-beli, netting 82 league goals in 198 appearances. In the 1975–76 season, Bjeković was the Yugoslav First League top scorer with 24 goals, helping Partizan win its seventh championship title.

In 1976, Bjeković moved abroad to France and signed with Nice. He played five seasons with Les Aiglons, scoring a total of 85 goals in 143 league appearances. In 2013, Bjeković was named the club's player of the century.

International career
At international level, Bjeković played 22 matches for Yugoslavia and netted four goals. He scored on his debut for the national team in a friendly match against Brazil in Belo Horizonte on 19 December 1968. His last cap came on 24 February 1976 in a 2–1 away friendly win over Algeria in Algiers.

Post-playing career
After hanging up his boots, Bjeković started his managerial career as an assistant to Miloš Milutinović at Partizan in 1982. He would replace Milutinović as manager at the start of the 1984–85 season. At the helm of Partizan, Bjeković won back-to-back championship titles in 1986 and 1987.

In 1987, Bjeković was appointed as manager of his former club Nice. He was released after two years in charge. In 1990, Bjeković returned to Partizan as manager, but stayed just two months.

After his managerial career, Bjeković served as sporting director of Partizan for almost two decades. He resigned from the position in May 2007.

On 17 April 2018, Bjeković was elected as vice-president of the Serbian Football Association.

Personal life
Bjeković is the father of fellow footballer Nenad Bjeković.

Career statistics

Club

International

Yugoslavia score listed first, score column indicates score after each Bjeković goal

Honours

Player
Proleter Zrenjanin
 Yugoslav Second League: 1966–67
Partizan
 Yugoslav First League: 1975–76
Individual
 Yugoslav First League Top Scorer: 1975–76

Manager
Partizan
 Yugoslav First League: 1985–86, 1986–87

References

External links

 
 
 

Association football forwards
Expatriate football managers in France
Expatriate footballers in France
FK Partizan managers
FK Partizan non-playing staff
FK Partizan players
FK Proleter Zrenjanin players
Ligue 1 managers
Ligue 1 players
OGC Nice managers
OGC Nice players
Serbian football managers
Serbian footballers
Serbian sports executives and administrators
Sportspeople from Zrenjanin
Yugoslav expatriate football managers
Yugoslav expatriate footballers
Yugoslav expatriate sportspeople in France
Yugoslav First League players
Yugoslav football managers
Yugoslav footballers
Yugoslav Second League players
Yugoslavia international footballers
1947 births
Living people